Kish Rural District is a rural district (dehestan) in the Kish District of Bandar Lengeh County, Hormozgan Province, Iran. At the 2006 census, its population was 79, in 9 families.  The rural district has 1  village.

References 

Rural Districts of Hormozgan Province
Bandar Lengeh County